Jenn Mann is an American psychotherapist, sports psychology consultant, author, and speaker.

She is the daughter of Barry Mann and Cynthia Weil, a famous songwriting couple. She was divorced from Joshua Berman in 2013.

Mann has a private practice as a psychotherapist in Beverly Hills, California.  She has appeared in media as "Dr. Jenn". She has acted as a relationship counselor for the VH1 reality shows Couples Therapy and spin-off Family Therapy. Until Sirius XM Radio dropped the Oprah Winfrey channel on December 31, 2014, Mann hosted a nightly radio call-in show. The show moved to a new channel in 2015.

References

Living people
American psychotherapists
Year of birth missing (living people)